Motbeg-e Sofla (also Romanized as Moţbeg-e Soflá; also known as Matbag Sofla, Modbag-e Soflá, Modbeg-e Soflá, Modig-e Pā’īn, Moţbak, Motbak-e Soflá, Moţbek-e ‘Abdollāh, and Moţlebek-e Pā’īn) is a village in Abdoliyeh-ye Gharbi Rural District, in the Central District of Ramshir County, Khuzestan Province, Iran. At the 2006 census, its population was 158, in 27 families.

References 

Populated places in Ramshir County